Harold Gordon Fowler was a sailor from Great Britain, who represented his country at the 1924 Summer Olympics in Meulan and Le Havre, France. Fowler took the silver in the 8 Metre and 7th in the Monotype. He also competed at the 1928 Summer Olympics in Amsterdam, Netherlands, where he became 8th in the 1928 competition.

References

Sources 
 

Olympic sailors of Great Britain
1899 births
1975 deaths
British male sailors (sport)
Sailors at the 1924 Summer Olympics – 8 Metre
Sailors at the 1924 Summer Olympics – Monotype
Sailors at the 1928 Summer Olympics – 12' Dinghy
Olympic silver medallists for Great Britain
Olympic medalists in sailing
People from Donington, Lincolnshire
Medalists at the 1924 Summer Olympics